Pararetifusus is a genus of sea snails, marine gastropod mollusks in the family Buccinidae, the true whelks.

Species
Species within the genus Pararetifusus include:
 Pararetifusus carinatus (Ponder, 1970) 
 Pararetifusus kantori (Kosyan, 2006)
 Pararetifusus kosugei (Kosyan, 2006)
 Pararetifusus tenuis (Okutani, 1966)
Species brought into synonymy
 Pararetifusus dedonderi Fraussen & Hadorn, 2001: synonym of Eclectofusus dedonderi (Fraussen & Hadorn, 2001)
 Pararetifusus sapius (Dall, 1919): synonym of Fusipagoda sapia (Dall, 1919)

References

External links
 World Register of Marine Species: Pararetifusus Kosuge, 1967

Buccinidae